Robert "Romeo" Coates (1772 – 21 February 1848) was an English eccentric, best remembered for his career as an amateur actor.  His self-image included a highly mistaken belief in his own thespian prowess.  Born in Antigua in the West Indies and educated in England, he began to appear in plays in Bath in 1809, and became notorious for his fondness for appearing in leading roles. His favourite part was the male lead in Shakespeare's Romeo and Juliet, hence his widely used nickname.  After professional theatrical producers failed to cast Coates in roles prominent enough to satisfy him, he used his family fortune to subsidise his own productions in which he was both the producer and the lead actor.

Coates claimed to be the best actor in Britain. He would appear in bizarre costumes of his own design, invent new scenes and dialogue mid-show, and repeat parts of the play he particularly liked—usually dramatic death scenes—up to three or four times a night. His fame quickly spread and people flocked to see whether Coates was really as bad as they had heard. They laughed, jeered, and pelted (i.e. threw things at) him; Coates sometimes turned to the audience and answered in kind. By 1816 audiences had tired of mocking Coates, and theatre managers were no longer willing to let him use their premises. After some years living in France to avoid creditors, he returned to England, married in 1823, and had two children who both predeceased him. Coates died in London in 1848, aged about 76, after a Hansom cab hit him outside the Theatre Royal, Drury Lane.

Biography

Actor
Robert Coates was born in Antigua in the West Indies, the only surviving child of a wealthy sugar planter, Alexander Coates, and his wife Dorothy. He was educated in England, and on returning to Antigua took part in amateur dramatics. When he inherited his father's estate and a large collection of diamonds in 1807, he moved to Bath, England, where he lived as a man of fashion. He eventually drew the attention of the manager of the Theatre Royal, Bath and had begun to appear in plays in 1809, though not as a professional actor.

Later he appeared in Romeo and Juliet in the part of Romeo – in a costume of his own design. The costume had a flowing, sky-blue cloak with sequins, red pantaloons, a vest of white muslin, a large cravat, and a plumed "opera hat," according to Captain Rees Howell Gronow – not to mention dozens of diamonds – which was hardly suitable for the part. The too-small garments caused him to move stiffly, and at some point, the seat of his pants split open. The audience roared with laughter.

Despite this ridicule, Coates went on to tour the British Isles. If a theatre manager would hesitate to let him show his talents, he would bribe them.  Managers, in turn, often called in the police in case things went seriously wrong.

Coates was convinced he was the best actor in business – or at least that is what he claimed.  He forgot his lines all the time and invented new scenes and dialogue on the spot. He loved dramatic death scenes and would repeat them – or any other scenes he happened to take a fancy to – three to four times over.

Coates claimed that he wanted to improve the classics. At the end of his first appearance as Romeo he came back in with a crowbar and tried to pry open Capulet's tomb. In another of his antics he made the actress playing Juliet so embarrassed that she clung to a pillar and refused to leave the stage. Eventually no actress would agree to play the part with him.

The audience usually answered with angered catcalls embarrassed jeering and a large pelting of orange peels – and loads of laughter. His fellow actors would try to make him leave the stage. If Coates thought the audience was getting out of hand, he turned to them and answered in kind.

His fame spread and people would flock to see whether he really was as bad as they had heard. For some reason, Baron Ferdinand de Géramb became his foremost supporter. Even the Prince Regent (the future King George IV) would go to see him. In 1811, when he played the part of Lothario in The Fair Penitent in London's Haymarket Theatre, the theatre had to turn thousands of would-be spectators away. In another performance in Richmond, Surrey, several audience members had to be treated for excessive laughter.

Coates went on with his antics. Once, when he dropped a diamond buckle when he was going to exit the stage, he crawled around the stage looking for it. During his first performance of Romeo & Juliet, he pulled out his snuff box in the middle of a scene and offered some to the occupants of a box. Then, during Romeo's death scene, Coates carefully placed his hat on the ground for a pillow and used his dirty handkerchief to dust the stage before lying on it. Finally, at the invitation of the audience, he acted out Romeo's death twice—and was about to attempt a third before his Juliet came back to life and interrupted him.  The amusement of the audience was enormous. There is some question as to whether Coates believed he was a great actor as he professed to, or if his performances were brilliant parody.

Offstage

Outside the stage Coates tried to amaze the public with his taste in clothing. He wore furs even in hot weather. He went out in a custom-built carriage with a heraldic device of a crowing cock and the motto While I live, I'll crow. In receptions he glittered from head to toe with diamond buttons and buckles. His predilection for diamonds of all kinds gave him the nickname "Diamond Coates".

Coates was never a professional actor, and only made his stage appearances in support of charitable causes: his own nickname of choice was 'the Celebrated Philanthropic Amateur'. After 1816 his performances ceased, as audiences had tired of laughing at him and theatrical managers were wary of allowing him use of their premises. Later he fell into financial difficulties and to avoid creditors moved to Boulogne-sur-Mer, where he met Emma Anne Robinson, daughter of a naval lieutenant.  After Coates put his finances back into better order they returned to England and were married on 6 September 1823. The two lived quietly in London, living lastly at his residence, 28 Montagu Square. They had two children, both of whom predeceased Coates. Emma remarried in the year of Coates's death, her second husband being Mark Boyd.

Robert Coates died in London in 1848 after a street accident.  He was caught and crushed between a Hansom cab and a private carriage as he was leaving a performance at the Theatre Royal, Drury Lane on 15 February, and died at home six days later. At his inquest the coroner brought in a verdict of manslaughter by person or persons unknown.  He is buried in an unmarked grave in Kensal Green Cemetery.

See also
 William Topaz McGonagall
 Florence Foster Jenkins
 Ed Wood
 Tommy Wiseau
 Mrs Miller

References 

 Banvard's Folly: thirteen tales of renowned obscurity, famous anonymity, and rotten luck by Paul Collins, 2001
 In the USA the Harvard Theatrical Collection has a collection of contemporary accounts of Coates' performances, mostly very critical.
 The Richmond Library local studies has two playbills from his appearances at the local theatre. He is not named, just referred to as AN AMATEUR.

External links
  Images of Robert Coates, mostly caricatures, are in the British Museum and may be found by searching the Collection
 Detailed but unsourced account of Coates' life.

1772 births
1848 deaths
19th-century English male actors
English male stage actors
Pedestrian road incident deaths
Road incident deaths in London
Theatre of the Absurd
Burials at Kensal Green Cemetery